Baixi Town is an urban town in Xinhua County, Loudi City, Hunan Province, People's Republic of China.

Administrative division
The town is divided into 75 villages and one community, the following areas: 
 
 Xiangxue Community
 Yuejinping Village
 Xiaoxi Village
 Hejiaping Village
 Huangdatang Village
 Dayuan Village
 Xinyuan Village
 Minzhu Village
 Minxin Village
 Tanshan Village
 Yulin'ao Village
 Huangbanqiao Village
 Pengjia Village
 Aimin Village
 Tuanjie Village
 Xinfeng Village
 Qingshan Village
 Dalian Village
 Wangjia Village
 Qingjing Village
 Rentian Village
 Tangchong Village
 Chuanyan Village
 Shiziwan Village
 Baiyantang Village
 Qinghe Village
 Qingtang Village
 Hujiawan Village
 Baixi Village
 Shiban Village
 Huilong Village
 Baiyan Village
 Eyang Village
 Rixin Village
 Fengqiling Village
 Lantang Village
 Tianhe Village
 Fuxi Village
 Nongke Village
 Yongyang Village
 Guangming Village
 Maoping Village
 Pingxi Village
 Lijia Village
 Yanquan Village
 Dongliu Village
 Dongping Village
 Sumei Village
 Wujiatai Village
 Nongke Village
 Yantang Village
 Daping Village
 Shicha Village
 Liming Village
 Chaxi Village
 Xiangtang Village
 Zhangjia Village
 Yanshan Village
 Daxiong Village
 Baoxi Village
 Hengjiang Village
 Chenjia Village
 Zhushan Village
 Tongshang Village
 Daiguan Village
 Yintang Village
 Shuangjiang Village
 Hengsha Village
 Lujia Village
 Yanshan Village
 Hongzhu Village
 Feiyue Village
 Exi Village
 Changtan Village
 Daxi Village
 Dongxi Village

Celebrity
Gong Gucheng, a lieutenant general in the People's Liberation Army.

References

External links

Divisions of Xinhua County